Route 77 may refer to:

Route 77 (MTA Maryland), a bus route in Baltimore, Maryland and its suburbs
London Buses route 77

See also
List of highways numbered 77

77